Guilherme Schimidt (born November 6, 2000) is a Brazilian judoka. He currently ranks 4th in the International Judo Federation world ranking in the under-81kg category.

Career 
In 2019, Guilherme was a bronze medalist at the Junior World Championships, held in Morocco.

On September 25, 2021, Guilherme won his first medal on the IJF world circuit by placing second in the Grand Prix of Zagreb (Croatia), in the category up to 81 kilos. He won three matches and lost the final to the Georgian Tato Grigalashvili.

On April 1, 2022, Guilherme won the gold medal in the under-81kg category of the Antalya Grand Slam. In the final, he defeated Vedat Albayrak, from Turkey.

On July 8, 2022, Guilherme won the gold medal in the 81kg category of the Hungarian Grand Slam by defeating the world champion Saeid Mollaei, from Azerbaijan.

References

External links
 

 Minas Tênis Clube judo team

Living people
2000 births
Brazilian male judoka
21st-century Brazilian people